Castle is an electoral ward and area of Bedford, Bedfordshire, England.

The boundaries of Castle Ward are approximately Bromham Road and Goldington Road to the north, Denmark Street to the east, Rope Walk to the south, with the Midland Main Line railway line and Ashburnam Road to the west.

Castle Ward includes almost all of Bedford town centre, as well as the eastern section of the Castle Road neighbourhood. Castle is the only Ward in the town of Bedford to be located on both sides of the River Great Ouse.

In common usage the 'Castle' area is often synonymous with the Castle Road neighbourhood.  Since local government boundary changes in Bedford in 2011, however, the Castle Road neighbourhood has been split between Castle Ward and Newnham Ward.

History

The name 'Castle' comes from Bedford Castle which is located in the ward. William II granted the Barony of Bedford to Paine de Beauchamp who built the castle. The castle was destroyed (slighted) in 1224 by Henry III. In 1166 the town of Bedford was given a charter. This was when Bedford Market was founded, and it is still held in Castle Ward.

To the south of the river, Cauldwell Priory was built in the area by Franciscan Friars in 1238. The priory included a leper colony dedicated to St Leonard. The priory was dissolved by King Henry VIII in 1541, and around this time a new bridge was built over the River Great Ouse, and the town of Bedford began to expand to the south of the river. The river became navigable as far as Bedford by 1689. Up until this time, Bedford was a small agricultural town, with wool being an important industry in the area for much of the Middle Ages. However, with the opening up of the River Great Ouse, wool declined in importance and brewing became a major industry in the town.

In 1660 John Bunyan was imprisoned for 12 years in Bedford Gaol, which was located in present-day Castle Ward. It was here that he wrote The Pilgrim's Progress.

The 19th Century saw Bedford transform into an important engineering hub.  In 1832 Gas lighting was introduced into the area that is now Castle Ward, and the railway reached Bedford in 1846. Bedford's Corn Exchange was built in the area in 1849, and the first drains and sewers were dug in 1864. Bedford's growth in the 19th century saw the Castle area expand along the river to the east.

After the Second World War, the Cauldwell Street neighbourhood of terraced houses was demolished, making way for new offices and public buildings, including headquarters for Bedford College and Bedfordshire County Council.

Governance
Castle is an unparished area, with all community services under the direct control of Bedford Borough Council. Castle elects two councillors to Bedford Borough Council, both currently from the Green Party, being the first Green Party councillors in Bedford.

Economy
Virtually all of the Bedford's central business district is located in Castle Ward, with many major High Street shops being located here. The main shopping areas of note are the High Street which includes a Wilko store, banks, many pubs, nightclubs and restaurants. The Harpur Centre is Bedford's main shopping centre. Branches of Boots, TK Maxx, Primark and various other stores are located here. Located in the eastern section of the Castle Road neighbourhood there are a host of smaller independent shops and community stores.

Many of Bedford's central amenities are located in Castle Ward, including Bedford's main post office, market, magistrates court, Bedford bus station and Bedford railway station. Two of Bedford's largest hotels are located in the Ward - The Swan Hotel on the High Street, and Mercure Bedford Centre Hotel situated across the river on St Mary's Street.

Also south of the river, there are a few more shops located around the St Mary's Street/St John's Street/Cauldwell Street area. It is here that Bedford College is located, as well as a Farmfoods store. Borough Hall, the administrative headquarters of Bedford Borough Council is also located here.

Education
Priory Primary School is located on Greyfriars, while Castle Newnham School has a campus for primary school age pupils situated on Goldington Road. For secondary school education Bedford Free School is located on Cauldwell Street, though many Castle students attend either Biddenham International School or Castle Newnham School.

Bedford Girls' School is an independent school for girls aged 7–18, located on Cardington Road in Castle Ward. The school is part of the Harpur Trust.

Bedford College has its main site on Cauldwell Street, and offers a range of further education courses including GCSEs, A Levels, Apprenticeships and Access courses.

Religious sites

There are many places of worship in Castle Ward, some of which serve the entire Bedford area -

 St Paul's Church, Bedford (Church of England), located on St Paul's Square
 Bedford Spiritualist Church, located on Ashburnam Road
 Mount Zion Church, located on Midland Road
 St Joseph & The Holy Child Roman Catholic Church, also on Midland Road
 St Frances Cabrini Italian Church, located on Woburn Road
 Rutland Road Church, located on Rutland Road
 The Miracle of God in Christ Church, located on Alexandra Road
 The Bedford Jamee Masjid & Islamic Cultural Centre, located on Brereton Road
 Bedford Pentecostal Church, located on Roise Street
 The Salvation Army run the Bedford Congress Hall, located on Commercial Road
 The Bedford Bangladeshi Mosque & Islamic Mission, also on Commercial Road
 The Bunyan Meeting Free Church & John Bunyan Museum, located on Mill Street
 Polish Church of Sacred Heart of Jesus & St Cuthbert, also on Mill Street
 The Panacea Society had its international headquarters on Albany Road
 The Providence Baptist Chapel, located on Rothsay Road
 The St Josaphat Ukrainian Church (Byzantine Rite), located on York Street
 St John's and St Leonard's Church (Church of England), located on St Johns Street and Victoria Road
 Southside Family Church (Newfrontiers), also on St Johns Street

Community facilities
The main open space in the Castle area is Russell Park and the Embankment of the River Great Ouse. The Bedford Corn Exchange, The Higgins Art Gallery & Museum and Esquires (a live music venue) are also located in Castle Ward.

References

External links
 History of Bedford & the Castle area

Areas of Bedford